Willard Ronald Sox (December 17, 1938 – April 22, 2006 in Richmond, Virginia) was an American drag racer.

His family ran a Sinclair (SOX SINCLAIR) station on Church St. in Burlington, North Carolina, where got his start in drag racing in the 1950s when the Police Club of Burlington began hosting races at an airport.

He raced at tracks throughout North Carolina and became a national sensation in the 1960s and early 1970s. Sox won five National Hot Rod Association championships and more than 59 events. Together with racing partner Buddy Martin, Sox was the winningest Pro Stock driver (nine victories in 23 events) in the 1970-72 "four-speed era".  Initially Martin and Sox were competitors, but Martin approached Sox to drive his car after concluding that he just couldn't beat him.

Sox drove a 1963 Chevrolet and then a factory-sponsored A/FX Mercury Comet in 1964.

In 1965, he drove an altered-Wheelbase Plymouth. He started the 1966 season in an injected, nitro-burning Barracuda Funny Car. 

Later he drove Plymouths in Pro Stock and had "Clinic" cars with Plymouths.

Sox went on to drive a Mercury Comet in IHRA Pro Modified for a few years before retiring from drag racing.

Sox was ranked 15th on the National Hot Rod Association Top 50 Drivers, 1951-2000.

He died of prostate cancer at the age of 67.

Awards

He was inducted into the Motorsports Hall of Fame of America in 2007, along with Buddy Martin.

References

External links
Ronnie Sox page from the NHRA Top 50 
Obituary at NHRA.com 
MoparWiki on Ronnie Sox 
Sox & Martin website

1938 births
2006 deaths
Racing drivers from North Carolina
People from Burlington, North Carolina
Deaths from prostate cancer
Dragster drivers
Deaths from cancer in Virginia